The Textile sector of Imperial Russia developed significantly in the nineteenth century. It played a significant role in the Industrialization in the Russian Empire.

In 1840 the Manchester based company De Jersey & Co. appointed Franz Holzhauer as their agent in Moscow with Ludwig Knoop as his assistant. At the time Manchester was known as Cottonopolis, and De Jersey and Co. played a major role in developing the cotton industry in the Russian Empire.

In 1895 the Russian Technical Society criticized Knoop for holding back the Russian textile industry by exclusively importing English textile machinery.

References

Russia
Industry in Russia
England–Russia relations
Economy of the Russian Empire